The 2004–05 Polish Volleyball League was the 69th season of the Polish Volleyball Championship, the 5th season as a professional league organized by the Professional Volleyball League SA under the supervision of the Polish Volleyball Federation.

BOT Skra Bełchatów won their 1st title of the Polish Champions.

Regular season

|}

Playoffs
(to 3 victories)

Final standings

External links
 Official website 

Polish Volleyball League
Polish Volleyball League
Polish Volleyball League
Polish Volleyball League